Vogg is a surname. Notable people with the surname include:

Ben Vogg (born 1992), Swiss equestrian
Felix Vogg (born 1990), Swiss equestrian
Flemming Vögg (1914–1991), Danish fencer